Anthony Mantle may refer to:

 Anthony Dod Mantle (born 1955), British cinematographer
 Anthony Jacques Mantle (1899–1988), Royal Naval Air Service pilot